Rosemary McMahon is a former Hong Kong international lawn bowler.

Bowls career
McMahon has represented Hong Kong at three Commonwealth Games; in the pairs event at the 1986 Commonwealth Games, in the singles the 1990 Commonwealth Games and in the singles at the 1994 Commonwealth Games.

She won two medals at the Asia Pacific Bowls Championships.

Family
Her husband Bill McMahon is also an international lawn bowler and her son is Mark McMahon.

References

Hong Kong female bowls players
Living people
Bowls players at the 1986 Commonwealth Games
Bowls players at the 1990 Commonwealth Games
Bowls players at the 1994 Commonwealth Games
Year of birth missing (living people)